Army of the Coasts of the Ocean or Armée des côtes de l'Océan may refer to:

Army of the Coasts of the Ocean (1796)